Below is a list of mixed martial arts events scheduled and held by Pride Fighting Championships.

Events

Event locations 
Seven cities in two countries have hosted a total of 68 events:

  Japan (66)
 Saitama – 25
 Tokyo – 16
 Yokohama – 11
 Nagoya – 6
 Osaka – 6
 Fukuoka – 2

  United States (2)
 Las Vegas, Nevada – 2

See also
 List of Pride champions
 List of Pride FC fighters
List of K-1 events
List of Bellator MMA events
List of DREAM events
List of EliteXC events
List of Invicta FC events
List of ONE Championship events
List of Pancrase events
List of PFL/WSOF events
List of Shooto Events
List of Strikeforce events
List of UFC events
List of WEC events

External links

Japan sport-related lists
Mixed martial arts events lists